Daniel Sherman may refer to:
Daniel Sherman (songwriter), British songwriter and producer
Daniel Sherman (judge) (1721–1799), American state legislator and judge from Connecticut
Daniel Sherman (actor) (born 1970), American actor, appeared in Wendigo
Daniel Sherman (politician), stood for California's 36th congressional district in the United States House of Representatives elections, 2000
Daniel Sherman (landowner), believed to own the first cottage on Murray Isle

See also
Dan Sherman (1890–1955), pitcher for the Chicago Federals baseball team in 1914